The Navajo's Bride is an American silent film produced by Kalem Company and directed by Sidney Olcott with Gene Gauntier and Robert Vignola in the leading roles.

A copy is kept in the Desmet collection at Eye Film Institute (Amsterdam)

Cast
 Gene Gauntier - 
 Robert Vignola -

External links

 The Navajo's Bride website dedicated to Sidney Olcott
Film at YouTube

1910 films
Silent American drama films
American silent short films
Films directed by Sidney Olcott
1910 short films
1910 drama films
American black-and-white films
1910s American films